Michael Jackson Chaney (born January 6, 1944) is the Commissioner of Insurance for the State of Mississippi.  He is a 1966 graduate of Mississippi State University with a Bachelor of Science in Business and Finance. Chaney is a veteran of the United States Army, serving in Vietnam in 1968–69.

Political career 

Chaney, a Republican, was elected Mississippi Insurance Commissioner for a 4-year term in 2007 and re-elected in 2011 and in 2015. Prior to his election as Insurance Commissioner in 2007, Chaney served seven years (1993 to 1999) in the Mississippi House of Representatives and eight years (2000-2008) in the Mississippi State Senate. During his terms in the Senate, Chaney served as the chairman of the Senate Education Committee. As chairman, Chaney was a co-writer of the Mississippi Adequate Education Program (MAEP). He was sworn-in as insurance commissioner on January 10, 2008.

Affiliations 
Commissioner Chaney has served on numerous community development entities, including serving as President of the Vicksburg/Warren County Chamber of Commerce and President of the Vicksburg/Warren County Economic Development Committee. He is also a Rotarian and Paul Harris Fellow. He is a past president of the Republican Elected Officials of Mississippi and serves on the state Republican Executive Committee. He is a member of the National Association of Insurance Commissioners. Chaney is also a lifetime member of the American Legion.

Personal life 
Chaney was born in Tupelo, Mississippi, and is married to Mary Thurmond Chaney, and has three children and eight grandchildren. He lives in Vicksburg, Mississippi. Chaney and his wife Mary belong to Christ Church in Vicksburg, an Episcopal Church.

Electoral history

External links 
 Mississippi Insurance Department Website
 Mike Chaney on Ballot Pedia 
 Mike Chaney bio on the National Association of Insurance Commissioner's Website
 Mississippi Republican Party Website
 Mississippi Republican Party Wikipedia page

References 

1944 births
21st-century American politicians
United States Army personnel of the Vietnam War
Living people
Republican Party members of the Mississippi House of Representatives
Republican Party Mississippi state senators
Mississippi State University alumni
Politicians from Tupelo, Mississippi
Politicians from Vicksburg, Mississippi
State insurance commissioners of the United States
United States Army soldiers